Zhang Ziyi (4 March 1925 – 23 March 2022) was a Chinese zootechnician and an academician of the Chinese Academy of Engineering. He was a member of the 7th and 8th National Committee of the Chinese People's Political Consultative Conference.

Biography 
Zhang was born in Linyi County, Shanxi, on 4 March 1925. His father was a Jinshi during the late Qing Dynasty (1644–1911) in Imperial China. After graduating from Hokkaido University in the Empire of Japan in 1945, he attended Kyoto University where he obtained his bachelor's degree in agronomy in Allied-occupied Japan in 1948 and doctor's degree in animal nutrition in 1952. 

Zhang returned to China in October 1952 and that same year became a group leader in the North China Institute of Agricultural Sciences. In January 1980, he took office as director of the Institute of Animal Husbandry, Chinese Academy of Agricultural Sciences, a position he held until January 2010.

On 23 March 2022, he died of an illness in Beijing, at the age of 97.

Honours and awards 
 1985 State Science and Technology Progress Award (Second Class) for the paper of Tables of Feed Composition and Nutritive Value in China
 1996 State Science and Technology Progress Award (Second Class) for the Study on Nutritional Parameters and New Technology of Feed Formula for Pigs and Chickens
 1997 Member of the Chinese Academy of Engineering (CAE)

References 

1925 births
2022 deaths
People from Linyi County, Shanxi
Engineers from Shanxi
Hokkaido University alumni
Kyoto University alumni
Members of the Chinese Academy of Engineering
Members of the 7th Chinese People's Political Consultative Conference
Members of the 8th Chinese People's Political Consultative Conference